Radiola linoides, the allseed flax, is a species of flowering plant belonging to the family Linaceae.

Its native range is Macaronesia, Europe to Mediterranean, Cameroon, Ethiopia, Tanzania to Malawi.

References

Linaceae